The MV Armorique is a passenger and freight ferry built for Brittany Ferries by STX Europe in Finland at a cost of £81 million (€110 million). The vessel was delivered to Brittany Ferries on 26 January 2009, it was originally planned for her to be delivered in September 2008. Armorique is named after a national park of outstanding beauty in western Brittany. Armorique was also the name of a previous Brittany Ferries vessel purchased for service between Portsmouth and St Malo in 1975 and sold in 1993.

The vessel was designed and built specifically for the Plymouth-Roscoff route, as a replacement for the MV Pont L'Abbe

Her maiden voyage was due to be on 10 February 2009 at 15.00hrs, sailing from Roscoff to Plymouth. However, due to severe weather conditions, this crossing was cancelled, and she sailed to Plymouth without passengers. The overnight crossing from Plymouth on 10 February went ahead, making this her maiden voyage.

Armorique sails under the French flag and is registered in Morlaix.

Routes

Current route 
 Plymouth - Roscoff

Other routes served 
 Portsmouth - Bilbao
 Portsmouth - Santander
 Portsmouth - Saint Malo
 Portsmouth - Caen
 Plymouth - Santander
 Poole - Cherbourg
 Roscoff - Cork
 Portsmouth to Le Havre 
 Rosslare - Saint Malo Freight Only

The Armorique is the only ship to have visited all the ports operated by Brittany Ferries.

Design 
Armorique is identical to the Cotentin from keel to deck five. The first deck of passenger space is on deck six rather than deck 7 as on the Cotentin.

Initial artist impressions from Aker Yards showed a vessel that shared a number of similarities to the Cotentin. However, Brittany Ferries released an altered artist's impression of the Armorique in December. Revisions include a design change to the funnel and upper cabin deck along with alterations to the proposed livery.

Pictures released by Brittany Ferries show the ship will have double deck vehicle access at the bow and stern to decks 3 and 5 though while on her usual route loading of deck 5 will be via an internal ramp due to lack of double deck facilities at Plymouth or Roscoff. The stern door will be narrower than the one fitted to the Cotentin.

External links

 Official Brittany Ferries Website

References

Notes

Ferries of the United Kingdom
Ferries of France
Ships built in Helsinki
2008 ships